Adriano Sofri (born August 1, 1942, Trieste) is an Italian former far-left terrorist, a journalist and a writer. He was convicted for ordering the assassination of Milan Police officer Luigi Calabresi in 1972. This was one of the most important murders during the historical period of social turmoil and political violence in Italy known as the "Years of Lead". Spanning from the late 1960s until the late 1980s, they were marked by a wave of both far-left and far-right incidents of political terrorism.

During the 1960s and 1970s, Sofri was the leader of the far-left terroristic and militant organization called Lotta Continua ("Continuous Struggle"), together with Giorgio Pietrostefani. Sofri spent his sentence between 1997 and 2012. In the meantime, he wrote for various Italian national newspapers, such as Il Foglio, La Repubblica, and Panorama. He is a daily columnist for Il Foglio still nowadays.

Calabresi murder and background

On 12 December 1969 took place the Piazza Fontana bombing in Milan, killing 17 people and wounding 88. Among those arrested and investigated there was the militant anarchist Giuseppe Pinelli. On 15 December 1969, while in police custody, Pinelli fell from a fourth floor window of the police building in Milan. The policemen present in the interrogation room claimed that Pinelli committed suicide, but many leftist circles believed him to have been murdered.

Despite the established fact that Calabresi wasn't even in the room at the moment of Pinelli's death, he became the target of an extensive left-wing media campaign, which accused him of being a manslaughter and lasted years. It was led especially by the newspaper of Lotta Continua (directed by Sofri at the time) and by the left-wing mainstream weekly L'Espresso. Lotta Continua newspaper explicitly wrote that Calabresi had to be "shot dead". 

An initial investigation in 1970 ruled Pinelli's death as an accident. 

On the morning of 17 May 1972, Luigi Calabresi was shot outside his home while going to work.

Aftermath and effects on public opinion  

Between 1971 and 1975, Milan prosecutor conducted a second thorough investigation for manslaughter on the policemen sharing the room with Pinelli. In 1975 he concluded that Pinelli fell down because he had fainted and collapsed on the window parapet, after he had approached the door-window to take some air (he had been kept in custody for two days and he hadn't received a lot food, he had been interrogated for hours in the room, it was an historical building and the parapet of the window was particularly low). The faint hypothesis was the only one consistent with the trajectory and the weight of the body of Pinelli.

16 later in July 1988, Leonardo Marino, an ex-activist of Lotta Continua moved by religion and sense of guilt, turned himself in to the police and confessed of taking part in the assassination of Calabresi. Marino explained that he drove the car while Ovidio Bompressi shot the policeman. He said that the assassination had been decided by Adriano Sofri and Giorgio Pietrostefani, the leaders of Lotta Continua. Sofri was then arrested with the two other partners.

The Piazza Fontana bombing, Giuseppe Pinelli's death, Calabresi's assassination and their subsequent investigations and trials are remembered as some of the most important events during the Years of Lead.

First trial, retrial and European Supreme Court. Escape of Pietrostefani. 
On 2 May 1990 in Milan, Sofri was convicted and sentenced to serve 22 years in prison. Pietrostefani and Bompressi also received 22 years, while Marino was sentenced to 11 years due to his collaboration.

In July 1991, the Court of Appeal of Milan upheld the convictions, but these were cancelled the following year by the Supreme Court of Cassation asking for a new proceeding. With a new judgment by another section of the Court of Appeal of Milan, Sofri and the others were acquitted in 1993. Unusually, when the trial arrived for the second time at the Supreme Court, the sentence was canceled again and a third proceeding was requested. It took place and Sofri was convicted with the partners by yet another section of the Court of Appeal of Milan in 1995. Finally, the Supreme Court in its third review confirmed this judgment, ending the trial with a conviction in 1997.

After 2 years of prison, in 1999 Sofri and Pietrostefani asked and obtained by the Supreme Court a temporary suspension of the sentence and a retrial. This is an exceptional measure, quite unusual in the Italian justice system, and it was granted because of the complicated legal path and the high political pressure on the first trial at the time. In the meanwhile, they were released from prison waiting for the hearings; these were held by the Court of Appeal of Venice, the only one accepting to do the procedure at the time. In 2000 the Court celebrated a new trial and sentenced a confirmation of the convictions, later ratified by the Supreme Court. While Sofri accepted the sentence and returned in prison, Pietrostefani had already fled in France. He remained fugitive and never came back to serve its sentence, because French authorities refused to extradite him under the Mitterrand doctrine.

In 2003 the European Court of Human Rights refused yet another appeal made by Sofri and Pietrostefani for another retrial, calling it "inadmissible" and sentencing that their trial had been fair: "the trial inspected [by us] did not deteriorated the rights of the defense" and "did not deteriorated the equity of the proceeding".

Opinion movement for presidential pardon 
Throughout all the proceedings there was a large opinion movement in favor of Sofri, made by relevant politicians, intellectuals and artists such as Dario Fo, Erri De Luca, Carlo Ginzburg, Giuliano Ferrara, Gad Lerner, Luigi Ciotti, Walter Veltroni, Piero Fassino, judge Ferdinando Imposimato, Marco Pannella.  

At the end of November 2005, Adriano Sofri suffered of Boerhaave syndrome while in prison. He was moved to the hospital and lots of national figures asked the President of the Republic to give him a pardon. However Justice Minister Roberto Castelli refused to do the request to the President. After the defeat of Silvio Berlusconi at the April 2006 election, the new government's Justice Minister Clemente Mastella announced that Sofri could be pardoned. However Sofri refused to make a formal request, saying the request by himself would have been like an admission of guilt. The Justice Minister commented: "The truth is that 34 years after the events Sofri is a very sick person to whom one can offer a spontaneously humane gesture". In the end Sofri did not receive a pardon, but from 2007 he was allowed to serve his sentence under house arrest for medical reasons. The 22-year sentence ended in January 2012.

See also

 Years of lead (Italy)
 Lotta Continua
 Red Brigades

Notes and References

Further reading

 

 

1942 births
Living people
Italian male writers
Writers from Trieste
Italian communists
Communist terrorism
Terrorism in Italy
Years of Lead (Italy)
Italian people convicted of murdering police officers
La Repubblica people